New Zealand Orienteering Federation is the national Orienteering Association in New Zealand. It is recognized as the  orienteering association for New Zealand by the International Orienteering Federation, of which it is a member.

In addition to the traditional foot orienteering, the NZ Orienteering Federation also organizes Mountain bike orienteering, Ski orienteering and Rogaining.

History
The New Zealand Orienteering Federation joined the International Orienteering Federation in 1974, and New Zealand participated in the World Orienteering Championships first time in 1976.

References

International Orienteering Federation members
Orienteering
Orienteering in New Zealand